Ott Tänak (born 15 October 1987) is an Estonian rally driver and the 2019 World Rally Champion. He is currently teamed with Martin Järveoja and is competing for M-Sport World Rally Team.

Tänak achieved his maiden drivers' world title in the 2019 World Rally Championship, making him the first Estonian to win the drivers' championship, the first non-Frenchman to win the title since Petter Solberg in 2003 and the first for Toyota since Didier Auriol in 1994.

Career

Early career
Tänak won the Estonian Rally Championship in 2008 and 2009, driving for the team run by former world rally winner Markko Märtin. Tänak made his World Rally Championship debut on the 2009 Rally de Portugal, finishing 20th overall. In September 2009 Tänak won the European Pirelli Star Driver shootout held in Austria. This gave him the opportunity to compete six rounds of the 2010 World Rally Championship season in PWRC support category programme. He won the WRC category on the 2010 Rally Finland and 2010 Rally GB.

2011
In 2011, Tänak drove 7 rallies with a Ford Fiesta S2000, prepared by MM-Motosport team under Markko Märtin's instructions. He made a five-year contract with Ford.

Tänak scored his first WRC points in the 2011 Rally Mexico, and finished second in SWRC. In Italy he collected his first class win with an outstanding performance. He continued to impress in Greece, as he was leading after the first day, but rolled his car on the first stage of the second day, and had to retire. In Finland he finished 3rd, and looked like he has only mathematical chances of winning the title. But with victories in Germany and France, he put himself back into title contention, arriving in Spain only 3 points behind leader Juho Hänninen. However, he hit a rock on the first stage, breaking his Fiesta S2000's front crossmember, and had to restart under SupeRally rules, meaning that he basically lost all of his chances of becoming the champion. He finished the event sixth in SWRC, and runner-up to Hänninen in the championship standings.

He made his debut in a WRC-spec Ford Fiesta prepared by M-Sport Stobart at the 2011 Wales Rally GB, testing tyre supplier DMACK's tyre compounds in preparation for their entry into the championship in 2012.

2012

In 2012, Tänak was the number one driver for M-Sport Ford World Rally Team, and with a Ford Fiesta RS WRC he drove the full 2012 season. At the Rally Sweden Tänak took his first stage win on SS14. He later had a season with ups and downs. After retiring in Sweden with engine failure, he finished fifth in Mexico. But in Portugal, he slid off the road, forcing him to return under Rally2 (formerly SupeRally) rules. The next round, Rally Argentina started well for Tänak, but continued badly: he collected punctures, and slid back to 37th, but fought his way back to 10th. In Greece, he was doing well until he had to stop due to suspension damage and had to use Rally2 again. He crashed out in New Zealand, but on Rally Finland, the next round, he bounced back with a 6th-place finish. He followed this up by two crashes in Germany and Great Britain. After these poor performances, he went on to finish sixth in France. He scored his first podium in Italy, the penultimate round of the season, by finishing 3rd behind winner Mikko Hirvonen and Evgeny Novikov. The final round of the season, the Catalunya Rally, was bittersweet to him: on the first day, he was even leading the rally, and was lying fifth when he crashed out on the last stage. He finished 8th in the final standings, winning 8 stages during the season.

2013
In the year 2013, Tänak was no longer a part of M-Sport World Rally Team and was forced to leave the WRC stage. He started competing in and leading a team at Estonian national rallies, OT Racing, and the first rally under his direction was Võru Talveralli 2013.
Tänak's first competitive rally in 2013 was Rally Tallinn, driving a Subaru Impreza WRX STi N12, in which he finished 2nd, just after Georg Gross, who was driving a 2008 Ford Focus WRC, and just 0.4 seconds ahead of Alexey Lukyanuk, who was driving in a Mitsubishi Lancer Evolution 10. In season total, he finished 6 rally events, of which one he won and came 2nd in the rest, all behind Georg Gross.
At the season finale, Saaremaa Rally, Tänak led the event at the penultimate stage by just 4.4 seconds ahead of Georg Gross. Five stages before the penultimate stage, Tänak, with his WRC experience, knew that he would have to really push in the early morning when others are still waking up. He succeeded and built a lead of 15.9 seconds ahead of Egon Kaur and 20 seconds ahead of Georg Gross. But it wasn't enough, he was driving on the limits of his Subaru Impreza and couldn't go any faster. Georg Gross caught him on the final stage and won by 2.4 seconds.
He finished the season by winning the N4 class with 3 points ahead of Timmu Kõrge.

2014

Tänak joined the DMACK World Rally Team in 2014, which he drove under WRC2, and M-Sport, where he took part in Sweden, Portugal and Sardegna with a Ford Fiesta RS WRC. Raigo Mõlder served as his co-driver and his WRC-2 teammate was Jari Ketomaa.

2015
In 2015, Tänak returned to M-Sport Ford World Rally Team following the retirement of Mikko Hirvonen to compete in the Ford Fiesta RS WRC. His best result of the season was claiming third in the 72nd Rally Poland, matching his career-best result.

2016
Ott Tänak left the M-Sport World Rally Team and returned to the DMACK World Rally Team, the team he drove for at selected events in 2014. Tänak achieved two podium finishes during 2016 season. Having dominated most of the Rally Poland, Tänak suffered puncture in the penultimate stage and lost out to eventual winner Andreas Mikkelsen. He picked up another podium in Wales Rally where he also finished second. Tänak finished the season 8th.

2017

After a year in DMACK World Rally Team, Tänak returned to M-Sport Ford World Rally Team, teaming up with 4-time world champion Sébastien Ogier, who chose M-Sport after Volkswagen's withdrawal. Tänak changed co-drivers, with Martin Järveoja replacing Raigo Mõlder. Tänak started the year off well, driving himself to third place in both Monte Carlo and Argentina, and to second place in Sweden. In Portugal, Tänak led at the end of day 1, but hit a bank and punctured a tire early on during day 2, eventually finishing 4th. However, in the next round in Sardinia, Tänak inherited the lead after a mistake by Hayden Paddon, and despite a final day charge by Jari-Matti Latvala, finally took his first WRC event win. He squandered the chance of back-to-back wins when he crashed early on during the final day in Poland. After a frustrating seventh-place finish in Finland, Ott surprised many by taking a faultless win in Germany, marking the first time Ford or M-Sport have won in Germany since it became a WRC event in 2002. The Estonian went on to finish the final events of the year third (Spain), second (Wales) and sixth (Australia), guaranteeing him overall third place in the championship behind teammate Ogier and Thierry Neuville.

2018

Before the 2018 season Tänak signed a two-year deal with Toyota Gazoo Racing WRT, run by 4-time world champion Tommi Mäkinen. His team-mates for the season were Jari-Matti Latvala and Esapekka Lappi. While many speculated that the Estonian would take considerable time to get used to the team and the car, Tänak proved people wrong by showing immediate speed in the Toyota - finishing second in the opening round in Monte Carlo, following it up with another podium in Corsica and winning in Argentina, having led from day one by a strong margin. Both him and his Toyota car demonstrated their highly competitive performance round-after-round, but similarly to Sebastien Ogier, Tänak was hampered by the starting order in Sweden and suffered a turbo failure in the high altitudes at Mexico. Tänak replicated his earlier success in Argentina with three consecutive rally wins in Finland, Germany and Turkey, putting him in striking distance for the drivers championship behind Ogier and Neuville with three events left. Unfortunate performances in Great Britain and Spain left Ott with narrow chances at the title, being 23 points off the lead with one event left. Tricky conditions took Ott out of contention for the title and he finished the Australian event in 4th. Jari-Matti Latvala's win in the final rally meant that Toyota Gazoo Racing WRT won the constructors championship for the first time since 1999.

2019
Continuing the overall trend from the previous two seasons, Ott Tänak finished third in Monte Carlo behind rivals Thierry Neuville and Sebastien Ogier. He then went on to win in Sweden, marking the first time Ott had led the points standings in the WRC driver's championship. Paving the way for the first time in his career, he managed second place in Mexico, retaining first place in the championship over Ogier by 4 points. Tänak won the debuting Rally Chile ahead of Sebastien Ogier and Sebastien Loeb, and despite a last-minute loss in the 2019 Rally Italia Sardegna, won four more rallies before securing his first driver's championship trophy in the 2019 Rally Catalunya, following an early power steering failure by Ogier in the first leg and a Power Stage victory by Tänak. Tänak became the first driver who is not French and called Sébastien to win the World Rally Championship since 2003.

2020

In October 2019 Tänak signed a two-year deal with Hyundai. He could have been selected number 1, which is reserved for the champion for the previous season but he decided to keep the number 8 during the season. Tänak's title defence began with a major shunt at the Monte Carlo Rally, with his Hyundai i20 bottoming out on a bump in Stage 4 and flying off a 40 metre high cliff at 180 km/h, rolling end-over-end through a series of trees before landing on the road below – with both him and Järveoja remarkably walking away uninjured. Tänak made up for this with a second-place finish in Sweden, just below Elfyn Evans who won the event.

2021

Hyundai's Hyundai i20 Coupe WRC Car was very fast but reliability issues, mechanical issues and damage cost them points.

Tänak and Järveoja retired from leading the 2021 Monte Carlo Rally and retired from the 2021 Rally Catalunya. He retired from the lead at the 2021 Rally de Portugal because of damage to the rear right suspension. He clipped a rock and crashed out of the lead at the 2021 Rally Italia Sardegna and retired from Day 1 at his Home Rally, the 2021 Rally Estonia due to a puncture.

Tänak also couldn't participate in the Final event of the year, the 2021 Rally Monza, due to "personal family matters". Teemu Suninen and Mikko Markkula replaced them for that event.  

Tänak and Järveoja Won the 2021 Arctic Rally Finland, and scored 3 more podiums at the 2021 Safari Rally, the 2021 Acropolis Rally, and the 2021 Rally Finland. 

He also finished 4th at the 2021 Croatia Rally and 6th at the 2021 Ypres Rally Belgium. 
Tänak and Järveoja finished the season in 5th place on 128 points.

2022
With new regulations mandating the use of a hybrid system in place for 2022 and onwards, Hyundai World Rally Team faced a new challenge. Team Principal Andrea Adamo left the team due to personal reasons. Hyundai's new Hyundai i20 N Rally1 Car was neither competitive nor reliable at the first round in Monte Carlo and Tänak and Järveoja retired from the rally.

Tänak and Järveoja scored their first podium of the season at the Croatia Rally. Leader Kalle Rovanperä lost time to Tänak, who was in second place; due to a puncture. In the penultimate stage of the rally Tänak chose soft tyres over Rovanperä's hards, meaning he not only won the stage, but gained 29.8 seconds over Rovanperä and got the overall lead with 1.4 seconds. In the powerstage he could not match Rovanperä's time and lost the rally by 4.3 seconds.

At the Rally Italia Sardegna, Tänak and Järveoja were fighting with Elfyn Evans and later with Esapekka Lappi for the rally lead on Friday after Evans' retirement. Tänak took the overall lead on SS4 and lost it on SS7 due to transmission issues and reportedly only having three wheel drive. SS8 and 9 were cancelled. In the opening stage of Saturday, Lappi crashed and Tänak now lead the rally. He held a comfortable lead over Craig Breen and won the rally with 9 stage wins.

2023
For 2023 season Ott returned to his old team M-Sport and driving with Ford Puma Rally1 car. In his first rally of 2023 with Puma he achieved fifth place from Monte Carlo Rally. The second round, Rally Sweden, saw Ott Tänak and Martin Järveoja take an early lead, before losing it to Craig Breen and James Fulton on Friday evening. However, Tänak and Järveoja fought back on Saturday evening, and won the event. This was his first win with Ford Puma Rally1 car.

Personal life
Tänak was born in Kärla, Saare County. He married Janika Tänak in 2016, with whom he has two children, a son named Ron and a daughter named Mia. In 2017, Ott Tänak was chosen for the Estonian Athlete of the Year award, and in 2018, he and Martin Järveoja were chosen for the Estonian Sports Team of the Year award.

A documentary film about Tänak's life and rallying career titled Ott Tänak: The Movie was announced in December 2018. The film provides a rare look at the Estonian rally driver's early life on the island of Saaremaa and eventual rally career through interviews from his friends, relatives and colleagues in the sport, interspersed with archive and filmed footage of his past and current rallies. It was released theatrically in Estonia on 11 April 2019.

Rally wins

WRC victories

Wins per rally

WRC-2 victories

S-WRC victories

P-WRC victories

ERC victories

Other notable victories

Racing record

WRC summary

WRC results

* Season still in progress.

PWRC results

SWRC results

WRC-2 results

ERC results

References

External links

Profile on WRC.com 
Profile on eWRC-results.com
Profile on Motorsport.com

1987 births
Living people
People from Saaremaa Parish
Estonian rally drivers
World Rally Championship drivers
Motorsport team owners
World Rally Champions
Toyota Gazoo Racing drivers
Hyundai Motorsport drivers
M-Sport drivers
European Rally Championship drivers